Alec Denman was an award-winning, Grey Cup champion and all-star Canadian football player, playing from 1923 to 1933 with the Hamilton Tigers.

A graduate of Woodstock College Denman went on to have an all-star 11 year football career with the Tigers. Select 4 times as an all-star and the winner of 3 Grey Cups, his best season was 1932 when, in addition to his all-star, he won the Jeff Russel Memorial Trophy as outstanding player in the east. Curiously, Denman was part of an inquiry by the Director of Dental Services for Ontario, and he reported having lost 3 teeth playing football.

References

Players of Canadian football from Ontario
Hamilton Tigers football players
Year of birth missing
Year of death missing